The Commissioner for Climate Action is a post in the European Commission. It was created in 2010, being split from the environmental portfolio to focus on fighting climate change.  

The European Union has made a number of moves in regard to climate change. Most notably it signed the Kyoto Protocol in 1998, set up its Emission Trading Scheme in 2005 and is currently agreeing to unilaterally cut its greenhouse gas emissions by 20% by 2020.

List of commissioners

See also

European Climate Change Programme
Directorate-General for Climate Action (European Commission)
Climate of Europe
Energy policy of the European Union

References

External links
Current Commissioner Miguel Arias Cañete's website
Former Commissioner Connie Hedegaard's website
DG Climate Action website

Climate Action
European Green Deal